Boulder City is an unincorporated community in Newton County, in the U.S. state of Missouri. The community is on Missouri Route O, one mile west of Indian Creek and approximately nine miles southeast of Neosho.

Boulder City was so named on account of boulders near the original town site.

References

Unincorporated communities in Newton County, Missouri
Unincorporated communities in Missouri